Chocolate Frog may refer to:

Litoria mira, a tree frog nicknamed the "chocolate frog"
Chocolate Frog (Harry Potter)
Chocolate Frog Records, an independent record label formed in 2001 by the singer Fish
The Chocolate Frog, play